Jimmy Ritz (born Samuel Joachim; October 4, 1904 – November 17, 1985), was an American comedian and actor. He was also the second Ritz Brother.

Early life
Ritz was born Samuel Joachim to parents Max (December 1871 – January 4, 1939) and Pauline Joachim (May 1874 – November 26, 1935) on October 4, 1904. His father was a haberdasher from Austria-Hungary and his mother was Russian. Ritz had three brothers, George, Al, and Harry, and a sister, Gertrude Soll.

Career
The Ritz Brothers began as a dancing act in 1925, and by 1929 they had become vaudeville headliners. When vaudeville faded, they took their act, which combined complicated dance routines, sound-alike singing voices and a distinctively zany, juvenile humor (their theme song was titled Collegiate), to film, full theatrical presentations, and eventually television.

They were appearing on the Sunset Strip in Hollywood when movie producer Darryl F. Zanuck spotted them. Their first film, Sing, Baby, Sing, in 1936, was followed by On the Avenue, You Can't Have Everything, Life Begins in College, Hi'ya, Chum, One in a Million, The Gorilla, The Three Musketeers, The Goldwyn Follies, Straight, Place and Show, Pack Up Your Troubles, Argentine Nights, Behind the Eight Ball, Blazing Stewardesses and Won Ton Ton, the Dog Who Saved Hollywood, the last two with Harry only. Al died in 1965.

Death
Ritz died on November 17, 1985, in Los Angeles, California due to heart disease at the age of 81. He is buried with his brothers at the Hollywood Forever Cemetery in Los Angeles, California.

Filmography

References

External links

1904 births
1985 deaths
American male comedians
20th-century American comedians
American male film actors
Jewish American comedians
Jewish American male actors
Male actors from Newark, New Jersey
American male comedy actors
20th-century American male actors
Vaudeville performers
Burials at Hollywood Forever Cemetery
Jewish American male comedians
20th-century American Jews